Each "article" in this category is a collection of entries about several stamp issuers, presented in alphabetical order. The entries are formulated on the micro model and so provide summary information about all known issuers.

See the :Category:Compendium of postage stamp issuers page for details of the project.

Tadzikistan 

Refer 	Tajikistan

Tahiti 

Dates 	1882 – 1915
Capital 	Papeete
Currency  	100 centimes = 1 franc

Refer 	French Oceanic Settlements

Taiwan 

Dates 	1945 – 1949 ; 2007 –
Capital 	Taipei
Currency  	100 cents = 1 dollar

See also 	Chinese Nationalist Republic (Taiwan);
		Japanese Taiwan (Formosa)

Tajikistan 

Dates 	1992 –
Capital 	Dushanbe
Currency 	(1992) 100 kopecks = 1 Russian rouble
		(1995) 100 tanga = 1 Tajikistani rouble
		(2000) 100 diram = 1 Tajikistani somoni

Main Article Postage stamps and postal history of Tajikistan

See also 	Union of Soviet Socialist Republics (USSR)

Tanganyika 

Dates 	1922 – 1964
Capital 	Dar-es-Salaam
Currency  	100 cents = 1 shilling

See also 	German East Africa;
		Kenya Uganda & Tanzania (Combined Issues)

Tangier 

Dates 	1927 – 1957
Capital 	Tangier
Currency  	12 pence = 1 shilling; 20 shillings = 1 pound

Main Article Postage stamps and postal history of Tangier

Tangier (British Post Offices) 

Refer 	Tangier

Tangier (French Post Office) 

Dates 	1918 – 1942
Currency  	100 centimes = 1 franc

Refer 	French Post Offices Abroad

Tangier (Spanish Post Offices) 

Dates 	1921 – 1957
Currency  	100 centimos = 1 peseta

Refer 	Spanish Post Offices Abroad

Tannu Tuva 

Refer 	Tuva

Tanzania 

Dates 	1965 –
Capital 	Dar-es-Salaam
Currency  	100 cents = 1 shilling

See also 	German East Africa;
		Kenya Uganda & Tanzania (Combined Issues);
		Tanganyika;
		Zanzibar

Tasmania 

Dates 	1853 – 1912
Capital 	Hobart
Currency  	12 pence = 1 shilling; 20 shillings = 1 pound

Main Article Needed 

Includes 	Van Diemen's Land

See also 	Australia

Tchad 

Refer 	Chad

Tchongking (Indochinese Post Office) 

Dates 	1903 – 1922
Currency  	(1903) 100 centimes = 1 franc
		(1919) 100 cents = 1 piastre

Refer 	China (Indochinese Post Offices)

Telos 

Dates 	1912 – 1932
Capital  	Megalo Khorio
Currency  	100 centesimi = 1 lira

Refer 	Aegean Islands (Dodecanese)

Temesvar (Romanian Occupation) 

Dates 	1919 only
Currency  	100 filler = 1 korona

Refer 	Romanian Post Abroad

Temesvar (Serbian Occupation) 

Dates 	1919 only
Currency  	100 filler = 1 korona

Refer 	Serbian Occupation Issues

TEO 

Refer 	Syria (French Occupation)

Terre Adelie 

Refer 	French Southern & Antarctic Territories

Tete 

Dates 	1913 – 1920
Capital 	Tete
Currency  	100 centavos = 1 escudo

Refer 	Mozambique Territories

Tetuan (Spanish PO) 

Dates 	1908 – 1909
Currency  	100 centimos = 1 peseta

Refer  	Spanish Post Offices Abroad

Thai Occupation of Malaya 

Refer 	Malaya (Thai Occupation)

Thailand 

Dates 	1883 –
Capital 	Bangkok
Currency  	100 satangs = 1 baht

Main Article Postage stamps and postal history of Thailand

Includes 	Malaya (Thai Occupation);
		Siam;
		Siam (Thailand)

Thailand (British Post Office) 

Refer 	Bangkok (British Post Office)

Thessaly (Turkish Occupation) 

Dates 	1898 only
Currency  	40 paras = 1 piastre

Refer  	Turkey

Thrace 

Main Article Needed 

Includes 	Adrianople;
		Dedêagatz (Greek Occupation);
		Eastern Thrace;
		Gumultsina;
		Thrace (Allied Occupation);
		Western Thrace;
		Western Thrace (Greek Occupation)

See also 	Greek Occupation Issues

Thrace (Allied Occupation) 

Dates 	1919 – 1920
Currency  	100 stotinki = 1 lev (Bulgarian)

Refer 	Thrace

Thuringia (Russian Zone) 

Dates 	1945 – 1946
Capital 	Erfurt
Currency  	100 pfennige

Refer 	Germany (Allied Occupation)

Thurn & Taxis 

Dates 	1852 – 1867
Currency  	30 silbergroschen = 1 thaler (north)
		60 kreuzer = 1 gulden (south)

Refer 	German States

Tibet 

Dates 	1912 – 1959
Capital 	Lhasa
Currency  	6.67 trangka = 1 sang

Main Article Postage stamps and postal history of Tibet

Tibet (Chinese Post Offices) 

Dates 	1911 – 1912
Currency  	12 pies = 1 anna; 16 annas = 1 rupee

Refer  	Chinese Empire

Tientsin (French Post Office) 

Dates 	1903 – 1922
Currency  	100 centimes = 1 franc

Refer 	French Post Offices Abroad

Tientsin (Italian Post Office) 

Dates 	1917 – 1922
Currency  	100 cents = 1 dollar

Refer 	Italian Post Offices Abroad

Tierra del Fuego 

Dates 	1891 only
Currency  	centigrammes of gold dust (centavos)

Refer 	Argentina
Chile

Timișoara 

Refer 	Temesvar (Romanian Occupation)

Timor 

Dates 	1885 – 1976
Capital 	Dili
Currency  	(1885) 1000 reis = 1 milreis
		(1894) 100 avos = 1 pataca
		(1960) 100 centavos = 1 escudo

Main Article  Postage stamps and postal history of East Timor

Tobago 

Dates 	1879 – 1896
Capital 	Scarborough
Currency  	12 pence = 1 shilling; 20 shillings = 1 pound

Refer 	Trinidad & Tobago

Togo 

Dates 	1957 –
Capital 	Lomé
Currency  	100 centimes = 1 franc

Main Article Needed 

Includes 	Togo (French Colony)

See also 	German Togo;
		Togo (Anglo-French Occupation)

Togo (Anglo-French Occupation) 

Dates 	1914 – 1919
Currency  	British, French & German all used concurrently

Main Article Needed 

See also 	German Colonies;
		Togo

Togo (British Occupation) 

Refer 	Togo (Anglo-French Occupation)

Togo (French Colony) 

Dates 	1921 – 1957
Currency  	100 centimes = 1 franc

Refer 	Togo

References

Bibliography
 Stanley Gibbons Ltd, Europe and Colonies 1970, Stanley Gibbons Ltd, 1969
 Stanley Gibbons Ltd, various catalogues
 Stuart Rossiter & John Flower, The Stamp Atlas, W H Smith, 1989
 XLCR Stamp Finder and Collector's Dictionary, Thomas Cliffe Ltd, c.1960

External links
 AskPhil – Glossary of Stamp Collecting Terms
 Encyclopaedia of Postal History

Tad